Headless is a 2015 American horror film directed by Arthur Cullipher. It is based on the film within a film from the  2012 horror film Found.   The film was funded by donors from Kickstarter, and the first festival screening was in February 2015 in Indianapolis.

Plot summary

In this "lost slasher film from 1978," a masked killer wages an unrelenting spree of murder, cannibalism, and necrophilia. But when his tortured past comes back to haunt him, he plunges to even greater depths of madness and depravity, consuming the lives of a young woman and those she holds dear.

Cast
 Shane Beasley as The Killer

 Kaden Miller as Skull Boy / The Killer (Child)
 Matt Keeley as The Killer (Teenager)

 Kelsey Carlisle as Jess Hardy
 Ellie Church as Betsy Coard
 Dave Parker as Pete Christy
 Jennifer Lee as The Hitchhiker

Reception
HorrorNews.net awarded the film score of 4.5 out of 5, with the reviewer calling it "the most intensely disturbing film I’ve seen since Found". PopHorror.com wrote, "While Headless might prove a bit too much for some viewers, those in the market for more extreme and depraved fare will do themselves a disservice if they pass [it] up." Richard Taylor from Severed Cinema awarded the film 4/5 stars, calling it "one of the top horror movies of the year" while noting that it "gasses out a bit by the time the final act rolls out".

References

External links
 
 
 
 

2015 films
2015 horror films
2010s serial killer films
American independent films
American serial killer films
American slasher films
Kickstarter-funded films
2010s English-language films
2015 independent films
2010s American films